Prague High School may refer to:

Prague High School (Nebraska) in Prague, Nebraska
Prague High School (Oklahoma) in Prague, Oklahoma